Valeri Goryushev (26 April 1973 – 28 April 2014) was a Russian volleyball player who competed in the 1996 Summer Olympics and in the 2000 Summer Olympics. He was born in Yekaterinburg. In 1996 he was part of the Russian team which finished fourth in the Olympic tournament. He played seven matches. Four years later he won the silver medal with the Russian team in the 2000 Olympic tournament. He played two matches.

References

External links
 
 
 

1974 births
2014 deaths
Russian men's volleyball players
Olympic volleyball players of Russia
Volleyball players at the 1996 Summer Olympics
Volleyball players at the 2000 Summer Olympics
Olympic silver medalists for Russia
Sportspeople from Yekaterinburg
Olympic medalists in volleyball
Medalists at the 2000 Summer Olympics
20th-century Russian people
21st-century Russian people